Peter Lwabi is a consultant pediatric cardiologist at Mulago National Referral Hospital in Kampala, Uganda. He concurrently serves as the deputy executive director of Uganda Heart Institute (UHI). He also serves as the Head of the Pediatric Cardiology Division at Makerere University School of Medicine. He also sits on the board of directors of UHI.

References

External links
Website of Uganda Ministry of Health
A bad heart condition has caused her body to swell

Living people
Ugandan cardiologists
People from Eastern Region, Uganda
Academic staff of Makerere University
Year of birth missing (living people)